Salina Presbyterian Church (also known as The Crosby Memorial Church) is a historic church at 204 S. 1st East in Salina, Utah.

It was built in 1884 and added to the National Register of Historic Places in 1980. The building is now being restored as a private residence.

References

Churches completed in 1884
Presbyterian churches in Utah
Churches on the National Register of Historic Places in Utah
Buildings and structures in Sevier County, Utah
National Register of Historic Places in Sevier County, Utah